Hi-Fi is a Russian dance pop group established in 1998, founded by composer Pavel Esenin and songwriter and producer Eric Chanturia. The concept of the group consisted of the male leader and two supportive dance-performers until 2006, when Katya Lee joined the group. 

Lee started her career in the band with the solo song "Vzletai". From then on, the female and male vocals were equal.
When Katya Lee left, the group went back to the old concept of the male singing. In 2009, Mitya Fomin left the group and started his solo career. Later in 2010, Katya Lee left the group and joined another popular girls band called Fabrika. The group has had many hits on the Russian charts and has won a "Best Dance Group" award on the Russian music channel Muz-TV in 2005.

Members
1998-2003: Thimote Pronkin, Mitya Fomin, Oksana Oleshko (Original line-up)
2003-2005: Thimote Pronkin, Mitya Fomin, Tatiana Tereshina (the latter replacing Oksana Oleshko)
2006-2009: Thimote Pronkin, Mitya Fomin, Katya Lee 
2009-2010: Thimote Pronkin, Katya Lee, Kyril Kolgushkin (the latter replacing Mitya Fomin)
2010-2011: Thimote Pronkin, Kyril Kolgushkin, Olesya Lipchanskaya (the latter replacing Katya Lee)
2011–present: Thimote Pronkin, Olesya Lipchanskaya  (a duo after Kyril Kolgushkin leaving)

Discography

Albums
Studio albums
1999: Первый контакт
1999: Репродукция
2001: Запоминай
2002: Новая коллекция 2002 (DJ remixes)
Collection albums
1999: Звёздная серия
2002: Best
2005: Любовное настроение
2008: Best 1

Awards / Nominations

Singles
As Hi-Fi

References

Russian pop music groups
Musical groups established in 1998
Winners of the Golden Gramophone Award